Rajesh Madhavan (born 1 November 1986) is an Indian actor and assistant director who works in Malayalam cinema. Rajesh made his acting debut in 2016 with a supporting role in Maheshinte Prathikaaram. He started his career as an assistant director in the industry with Thondimuthalum Driksakshiyum (2017). He is recognized for his works as actor and creative director for the film Thinkalazhcha Nishchayam and his role as Manaf in Kanakam Kaamini Kalaham in 2021. He is making his directorial debut with an upcoming film titled Pennum Porattum.

Filmography

Assistant director

Actor

Casting director
Nna Thaan Case Kodu

References

External links
 

Living people
1986 births
Indian film actors
Male actors in Malayalam cinema